David Perlov  (Hebrew: דוד פרלוב) (born 9 June 1930 in Rio de Janeiro, Brazil; died December 13, 2003, in Tel Aviv, Israel) was an Israeli documentary filmmaker.

Biography

David Perlov was born in Rio de Janeiro and grew up in Belo Horizonte. At the age of 10, he went to live with his grandfather in São Paulo. At the age of 22, he moved to Paris and worked as a projectionist for the newly established Cinematheque. In 1957, he made his first short film, Tante chinoise (Old Aunt China), based on drawings of a 12-year-old girl of the French provincial bourgeoisie of 1890 which he found in the cellar of the Paris house in which he was living. In 1958, Perlov immigrated to Israel, settling with his wife Mira on Kibbutz Bror Hayil. The couple had two daughters, the twins Yael Perlov and Naomi Perlov.

Film career
In 1963, Perlov made a 33-minute documentary In Jerusalem (בירושלים, Be-Yerushalayim). This film came to be one of the most important films of Israeli documentary cinema. Although Perlov made two feature films by 1972 (The Pill and 42:6), his film proposals were repeatedly rejected by the  Israel Broadcasting Authority and Israeli film board, which found his work too lyrical. In May of the year 1973, Perlov bought a 16 mm camera and filmed his everyday life alongside dramatic events that took place in Israel at the time. He continued this work for 10 years, sometimes with almost no economic resources, until Channel 4 of British television expressed an interest in the project in 1983. Produced in association with Israel's largest television and film studio, Herzliya Studios (Ulpanei Herzliya), the result was Perlov's work Diary (יומן).
From 1973 Perlov taught in the department of film and television at Tel Aviv University.

Awards and recognition
In 1999, Perlov was awarded the Israel Prize for his contribution to cinema.

See also
Cinema of Israel
Visual arts in Israel

References

External links
 David Perlov website

See also
List of Israel Prize recipients

1930 births
2003 deaths
Brazilian emigrants to Israel
Brazilian Jews
Israel Prize in cinema recipients
Israeli film directors
Israeli Jews
People from Rio de Janeiro (city)